Beaver Creek is a hamlet in the Rural Municipality of Dundurn No. 314, Saskatchewan, Canada. Listed as a designated place by Statistics Canada, the hamlet had a population of 107 in the Canada 2016 Census.

Demographics 

See also 
 List of communities in Saskatchewan
 List of hamlets in Saskatchewan
 Beaver Creek Conservation Area
 Designated place

References

Designated places in Saskatchewan
Dundurn No. 314, Saskatchewan
Organized hamlets in Saskatchewan